The anterior facial vein receives a branch of considerable size, the deep facial vein, from the pterygoid venous plexus.

References

External links
 http://www.dartmouth.edu/~humananatomy/figures/chapter_47/47-5.HTM 

Veins of the head and neck